The relations between Iraq and Kuwait are longstanding and complex, experiencing many changes throughout recent decades.

History
Prior to the discovery of oil, the lands comprising modern day Iraq and Kuwait shared significant political, economic, social, and cultural ties.  

In the 1930’s, popular movement emerged in Kuwait which called for the unification of the country with Iraq. This movement coalesced into the Free Kuwaiti Movement in 1938, which was established by Kuwaiti youths who were opposed to British influence in the region. The movement submitted a petition to the Iraqi government demanding that it support the unification of Kuwait and Iraq. Fearing that the movement would turn into an armed rebellion, the Al Sabah family agreed to the establishment of a legislative council to represent the Free Kuwaiti Movement and its political demands. The council's first meeting in 1938 resulted in an unanimous resolution demanding the unification of Kuwait and Iraq. The 1938 National Assembly was formally dissolved in 1939 after "one member, Sulaiman al-Adasani, in possession of a letter, signed by other Assembly members, addressed to Iraq's King Ghazi, requesting Kuwait's immediate incorporation into Iraq". This demand came after the merchant members of the Assembly attempted to extract oil money from Ahmad Al-Jaber Al-Sabah, a suggestion refused by him and upon which he instigated a crackdown which arrested the Assembly members in 1939.

In March 1939, an armed rebellion broke out in Kuwait by supporters of the movement, seeking to unify Kuwait with Iraq by force. Supported by the British, the Al Sabah family rapidly suppressed the rebellion, imprisoning numerous supporters of the movement. King Ghazi of Iraq publicly demanded that the prisoners be released and the Al Sabah family end their repressive policies towards members of the Free Kuwaiti Movement. 

King Ghazi of Iraq publicly demanded that the prisoners be released and the Al Sabah family end their repressive policies towards members of the Free Kuwaiti Movement. Attempts by Faisal king of Iraq to build a railway to Kuwait and port facilities on the Gulf were rejected by Britain. These and other similar British colonial policies made Kuwait a focus of the Arab national movement in Iraq, and a symbol of Iraqi humiliation at the hands of the British. 

Ever since Kuwait's independence in 1961, the Iraqi governments sought various opportunities to reclaim and annex Kuwait. A short-lived crisis evolved in 1961, as the Iraqi government threatened to invade Kuwait and the invasion was finally averted following plans by the Arab League to form an international Arab force against Iraqi designs on Kuwait. The Kuwait-Iraq 1973 Sanita border skirmish evolved on 20 March 1973, when Iraqi army units occupied El-Samitah near the Kuwaiti border, which evoked an international crisis. The relationship experienced a decade of thaw following the Iran–Iraq War, with Kuwait and other Gulf states supporting Iraq against Iran.

In 1990, Iraq accused Kuwait of stealing Iraqi oil through slant drilling, however some Iraqi sources indicated Saddam Hussein's decision to attack Kuwait was made only a few months before the actual invasion.  There were several reasons for the Iraq move, including Iraq's inability to pay more than $80 billion that had been borrowed to finance the war with Iran and also Kuwaiti overproduction of oil which kept oil revenues down for Iraq.  The invasion started on 2 August 1990, and within two days of intense combat, most of the Kuwaiti Armed Forces were either overrun by the Iraqi Republican Guard or escaped to neighboring Saudi Arabia and Bahrain. The state of Kuwait was annexed and proclaimed as Iraq's 19th province. During the Gulf War, Kuwait would soon be liberated by coalition forces. In July 1992 the matter of border demarcation was referred to the United Nations, which accurately mapped the boundary and then demarcated it on the ground, following the 1932 line with some small adjustments. The border initially was accepted by Kuwait but not Iraq. Iraq accepted the border in November 1994.  Since the fall of the Ba'ath Party regime in Iraq, relations have significantly improved between the two states.

In the mid-to-late 2010s, Kuwait hosted the international Iraq reconstruction conference and was Iraq's biggest financial investor in the conference. On 19 June 2019, Emir of Kuwait, Sabah Al-Ahmad Al-Jaber Al-Sabah, visited Iraq for the second time following the 2012 Arab League summit in Baghdad. In August 2019, Iraq sent a protest letter to the United Nations regarding the installation of an observation tower on Fisht al-Aych.

In 2019, Iraq was Kuwait's leading export market and food/agricultural products accounted for 94.2% of total export commodities.

In August 2019, Iraq sent a protest letter to the United Nations regarding the geographical changes that the Government of Kuwait has made in the maritime area that lies beyond marker 162 in Khor Abdullah by upraising a shoal, which is designated as Fisht al-Aych.

In March 2021, Iraq has so far paid $49.5 billion in war reparations to Kuwait while Iraq’s dues now amount to only $2.5 billion. On 13 January 2022, Iraq made its final reparations payment to Kuwait, with a claim of $52.4 billion being paid off. In response, the United Nations Compensation Commission declared Iraq as having fully paid its compensation to Kuwait for the invasion and occupation.

Kuwait's plans for economic development, such as the "Silk City project", involves developing mutually beneficial economic ties with Iraq. Kuwait Vision 2035 entails the development of northern Kuwait (near the Iraq border and key Iraqi cities). Economic projects like the "Abdali Economic Zone" are designed to cater to Iraqi markets.

In February 2023, Kuwait's foreign minister Sheikh Salem Abdullah Al-Jaber Al-Sabah said Iraq and Kuwait would hold talks aimed at resolving the maritime border dispute between the two countries.

See also
Foreign relations of Iraq
Foreign relations of Kuwait
Iraq–Kuwait border

References

External links
Rick Francona, Iraq: The Claim to Kuwait

 
Kuwait
Bilateral relations of Kuwait
History of Kuwait